Kurt Svanström (24 March 1915 – 16 January 1996) was a Swedish football midfielder who played for Sweden in the 1938 FIFA World Cup. He also played for Örgryte IS.

References

External links

1915 births
1996 deaths
Swedish footballers
Sweden international footballers
Association football midfielders
Örgryte IS players
1938 FIFA World Cup players